Bingo Airways was a Polish charter airline based at Warsaw Chopin and Katowice Airports.

History
The airline was founded in November 2011 and started flights on 15 May 2012. The airline flew to destinations in Egypt, Israel, Turkey, Greece, Spain and Tunisia from Poland.

Bingo Airways were well known for the smiley face and bright red nose on the front of their aircraft. One of Bingo's A320-200s, registered SP-ACK, was in a special livery of the Chupa Chups company logo.

On 10 January 2014, Bingo Airways marketing director Piotr Samson announced that they were planning to start up scheduled services for the airline but could not disclose any more information on destinations and startup dates until plans were finalized.

By mid-June 2014, Bingo Airways ceased operations as Polish authorities revoked its operating licence.

Fleet 
The Bingo Airways fleet as of May 2014:

Destinations

These are the destinations that were served by Bingo Airways:

Bulgaria
Burgas: Burgas Airport  
Cape Verde
Mindelo: Cesária Évora Airport
Egypt
Hurghada: Hurghada International Airport
Sharm el-Sheikh: Sharm el-Sheikh International Airport
Greece
Heraklion: Heraklion International Airport
Rhodes: Rhodes International Airport
Thessaloniki: Thessaloniki International Airport
Chania: Chania International Airport
Israel
Tel Aviv: Ben Gurion Airport
Poland
Poznań: Poznań–Ławica Airport
Warsaw: Warsaw Chopin Airport Base
Katowice: Katowice International Airport Base
Wrocław: Wrocław–Copernicus Airport
Spain
Palma, Majorca: Palma de Mallorca Airport
Tenerife: Tenerife South Airport
Tunisia
Enfidha: Enfidha–Hammamet International Airport
Turkey
Antalya: Antalya Airport
Bodrum: Milas–Bodrum Airport

References

External links

  via Wayback Machine

Airlines established in 2011
Airlines disestablished in 2014
Defunct airlines of Poland
2014 disestablishments in Poland
Polish companies established in 2011